Khosrowabad-e Amjadi (also Romanized as Khosrowābād-e Amjadī) is a village in Agahan Rural District, Kolyai District, Sonqor County, Kermanshah Province, Iran. At the 2006 census, its population was 223, in 54 families.

References 

Populated places in Sonqor County